Culross is an unincorporated community in south central Manitoba, Canada. It is located approximately 58 kilometers (36 miles) west of Winnipeg on Manitoba Highway 2 in the Rural Municipality of Grey.

The community was named for Culross, Fife, Scotland.

References 

Unincorporated communities in Pembina Valley Region